Back to the Future Part III is a 1990 American science fiction Western film and the final installment of the Back to the Future trilogy. The film was directed by Robert Zemeckis, and stars Michael J. Fox, Christopher Lloyd, Mary Steenburgen, Thomas F. Wilson, and Lea Thompson. The film continues immediately following Back to the Future Part II (1989); while stranded in 1955 during his time travel adventures, Marty McFly (Fox) discovers that his friend Dr. Emmett "Doc" Brown (Lloyd), trapped in 1885, was killed by Buford "Mad Dog" Tannen (Wilson), Biff's great-grandfather. Marty travels to 1885 to rescue Doc and return once again to 1985, but matters are complicated when Doc falls in love with Clara Clayton (Steenburgen).

Back to the Future Part III was filmed in California and Arizona, and was produced on a $40 million budget back-to-back with Part II. Part III was released in the United States on May 25, 1990, six months after the previous installment, and grossed $245 million worldwide during its initial run, making it the sixth-highest-grossing film of 1990. The film received a positive response from critics, who noted it as an improvement over its predecessor.

Plot

In 1955, moments after witnessing Emmett "Doc" Brown disappear in his DeLorean, Marty McFly learns that Doc was sent to 1885. Using information from Doc's 1885 letter, Marty and the 1955 Doc find and repair the DeLorean so Marty can return to 1985. However after finding it, Marty comes across a tombstone with Doc's name, with the inscription stating that Doc was shot by Biff Tannen's great-grandfather, Buford "Mad Dog" Tannen, six days after writing the letter.

Despite the letter's warnings, Marty travels back to 1885 to save Doc, arriving amidst a cavalry pursuit of Native Americans, tearing the car's fuel line in the process. Chased by a bear, he is knocked out and found by his Irish-born great-great-grandparents Seamus and Maggie McFly, who allow him to stay for the night. The next morning under the alias Clint Eastwood, he arrives in Hill Valley but runs afoul of Buford and his gang. Buford tries hanging Marty, but Doc rescues him. Doc agrees to leave 1885 after learning his fate, but without gasoline, the DeLorean cannot reach its required . He thus proposes using a steam locomotive to push the DeLorean to that speed.

While inspecting a rail spur, Doc saves the town’s new schoolteacher Clara Clayton from falling into the ravine, averting her death from the original timeline. They fall in love at first sight and form a close relationship. At a town festival for the courthouse, Buford tries shooting Doc, but Marty thwarts him. Buford then challenges him to a showdown in two days; an angry Marty accepts, believing that he and Doc would have left by then. Doc urges Marty not to react to provocation, letting slip that Marty has a life-changing accident in the future.

Although he is reluctant to return to 1985, Doc eventually visits Clara to end their relationship and bid her goodbye. However, feeling insulted, she dismisses his story about being from the future. Despondent, he goes on a drinking binge. In the morning, Buford arrives for Marty, who sees his alias appear in the photograph of the tombstone and refuses to duel. Doc passes out after downing just one shot and eventually revives but is taken hostage by Buford's gang, forcing Marty into the duel. Fooling Buford into believing he was fatally shot, Marty knocks him into a wagon of manure. Buford is promptly arrested for an earlier robbery.

On the train to San Francisco, Clara learns how heartbroken Doc is, pulls the train's emergency brake, and runs back to town. She finds the model of the time machine at his shop. Realizing Doc was telling the truth, she heads back to intercept him. Hijacking the locomotive, Doc and Marty push the DeLorean along the spur line. Clara boards the locomotive and tries to reach the car, but she falls, hanging by her dress. Marty, in the DeLorean, passes his hoverboard to Doc, and he uses it to save Clara and carry her to safety. Marty hits 88 mph and vanishes as the locomotive plunges off the unfinished bridge and explodes in the ravine.

Arriving in 1985, Marty escapes from the powerless DeLorean just before an oncoming freight train destroys it. Reuniting with Jennifer, he declines a street race with Needles, thus avoiding the future accident Doc warned him about. Jennifer opens the fax message she kept from 2015 and watches as the text regarding Marty's firing disappears.

As Marty and Jennifer examine the DeLorean wreckage, a steam locomotive suddenly appears, operated by Doc, Clara, and their children. Doc gives Marty a photo of them standing next to the town clock in 1885. When Jennifer asks Doc about the blank fax, he says it means that their future has not yet been written and encourages them to make it a good one. Doc and his family bid farewell and fly off in the locomotive to an unknown time.

Cast

 Michael J. Fox as:
 Marty McFly
 Seamus McFly
 Christopher Lloyd as Emmett "Doc" Brown
 Mary Steenburgen as Clara Clayton
 Thomas F. Wilson as:
 Biff Tannen
 Buford "Mad Dog" Tannen
 Lea Thompson as:
 Lorraine McFly
 Maggie McFly
 James Tolkan as Marshal James Strickland
 Matt Clark as Chester, a bartender
 Flea as Douglas J. Needles

Production

The origins of the western theme for Back to the Future Part III lie in the production of the original film. During filming for the original, director Zemeckis asked Michael J. Fox what time period he would like to see. Fox replied that he wanted to visit the Old West and meet cowboys. Zemeckis and writer/producer Bob Gale were intrigued by the idea, but held it off until Part III. Rather than use existing sets, the filmmakers built the 1885 Hill Valley from scratch. The western scenes were filmed on location in Oak Park, California, and Monument Valley. Some of the location shooting for the 1885 Hill Valley was done in Jamestown, California, and on a purpose-built set at the Red Hills Ranch near Sonora, California. Some of the train scenes were filmed at Railtown 1897 State Historic Park, a heritage line in Jamestown.

The shooting of the Back to the Future sequels, which were shot back-to-back throughout 1989, reunited much of the crew of the original. The films were shot over the course of 11 months, save for a three-week hiatus between filming of Parts II and III and concluded in January 1990. The most grueling part was editing Part II while filming Part III, and Zemeckis bore the brunt of the process over a three-week period. While Zemeckis was shooting most of the train sequences in Sonora, Gale was in Los Angeles supervising the final dub of Part II. Zemeckis would wrap photography and board a private plane to Burbank, where Gale and engineers would greet him on the dubbing stage with dinner. He would oversee the reels completed that day, and make changes where needed. Afterwards, he would retire to the Sheraton Universal Hotel for the night. The following morning, Zemeckis would drive to the Burbank Airport, board a flight back to the set in Northern California, and continue to shoot the film.

Although the schedule for most of the personnel involved was grueling, the actors found the remote location for Part III relaxing, compared to shooting its predecessor.

The role of Clara Clayton was written with Mary Steenburgen in mind. When she received the script, however, she was reluctant to commit to the film until her children, who loved Part I, "hounded" her.

The Hill Valley Festival Dance scene proved to be the most dangerous for Lloyd and Steenburgen; overzealous dancing left Steenburgen with a torn ligament in her foot.

The film also starred veteran western film actors Pat Buttram, Harry Carey Jr., and Dub Taylor, as three "saloon old timers". The inclusion of these noticeable Western actors was promoted in several documentaries about the film as well as the behind-the-scenes documentary of the DVD and in the obituary of one of the actors. The musicians of the Old West-style band in the film were played by ZZ Top.

Shooting a film set in the Old West was appealing to the stuntmen, who were all experienced horse riders. Gale recalled in 2002 that many stuntmen in Hollywood wanted to work on Part III. Thomas F. Wilson, who played Buford Tannen, chose to perform his own stunts and spent a great deal of time learning to ride a horse and throw his lariat. Filming was halted when Fox's father died and when his son was born.

Alan Silvestri, through his longtime collaboration with Zemeckis, returned to compose the score for Back to the Future Part III. Rather than dictate how the music should sound, Zemeckis directed Silvestri as he would an actor, seeking to evoke emotion and treating every piece of music like a character.

The photography in Part III was a "dream" for cinematographer Dean Cundey, who shared with much of the crew his excitement to shoot a western. Zemeckis wished to create a spectacular climax to the film. He coordinated the actors, a live 4-6-0 ten wheeler steam locomotive (the Sierra Railway 3), pyrotechnics, and special effects, and countless technicians all at once. As they had done with the previous two films in the trilogy, the visual effects for Part III were managed by effects company Industrial Light & Magic; the head of its animation department, Wes Takahashi, returned to once again animate the DeLorean's time travel sequences.

Home media and music

On November 8, 1990, MCA/Universal Home Video released Back to the Future Part III on VHS and on December 17, 2002 on DVD. It debuted on Blu-ray in 2010 for the film's 20th anniversary, followed by a second Blu-ray remaster in 2015 for the film's 25th anniversary and a 4K Blu-ray remaster in 2020 for the film's 30th anniversary.

The soundtrack was released under Varèse Sarabande on May 29, 1990 and features most of the score by Alan Silvestri and the orchestral version of the song "Doubleback" performed at the festival in 1885 during the film. A two-disc special edition was released on October 12, 2015 in commemoration of the film's 25th anniversary, which includes the original score (26 tracks) on disc one and an arrangement of alternate cues and source music on a second disc.

Reception

Box office
The film grossed $23 million in its first weekend of U.S. release and $87.6 million altogether in U.S. box office receipts (or about $ million in  dollars) – $246 million worldwide.

Critical response
The site's critical consensus reads: "Back to the Future Part III draws the trilogy to a satisfying close with a simpler, sweeter round of time-travel antics". On Metacritic, the film has a weighted average score of 55 out of 100, based on 19 critics, indicating "mixed or average reviews". Audiences polled by CinemaScore gave the film an average grade of "A−" on an A+ to F scale, same as the second installment.

Kim Newman of Empire gave the film four out of five stars, saying that the film "restores heart interest of the first film and has a satisfying complete storyline". He praised Michael J. Fox for "keeping the plot on the move" and mentioned that Christopher Lloyd and Mary Steenburgen's romance was "funny". He said that the film's ending was the "neatest of all" and it "features one of the best time machines in the cinema, promising that this is indeed the very last in the series and neatly wrapping it up for everybody".

Leonard Maltin preferred this film to the first two, giving it three-and-a-half stars out of four, praising the film as great fun, special effects, and imagination, also saying that the movie magic works in the film. Michael McWhertor of the website Polygon wrote that while the film was not better than the original entry in the series, it is nonetheless "leagues better than the second"; he praised the film's comedic and romantic elements and commended Thomas F. Wilson's performance as "Mad Dog" Tannen.

Roger Ebert of the Chicago Sun-Times gave the film two-and-a-half out of four stars. He said that the film's western motifs are "a sitcom version that looks exactly as if it were built on a back lot somewhere". Although Vincent Canby of The New York Times praised Christopher Lloyd's performance in the film, he also said that the film "looks as if it could be the beginning of a continuing television series". He complained that the film is "so sweet-natured and bland that it is almost instantly forgettable".

Commentators notice parallels between the films Time After Time and Back to the Future Part III. Mary Steenburgen has said:
Actually, I've played the same scene in that film (Time After Time) and in (BTTF) 'Part III,.. I've had a man from a different time period tell me that he's in love with me, but he has to go back to his own time. My response in both cases is, of course, disbelief, and I order them out of my life. Afterwards, I find out I was wrong and that, in fact, the man is indeed from another time, and I go after him (them) to profess my love. It's a pretty strange feeling to find yourself doing the same scene, so many years apart, for the second time in your career. The casting of Steenburgen for Back to the Future Part III appears to be deliberately intended to mirror the earlier role. In Time After Time, the woman lives in the 20th century and the time traveler is from the 19th. In Back to the Future Part III, the woman inhabits the 19th century and the time traveler is from the 20th. In both films, the woman eventually goes back with the time traveler to live in his own time period.

Accolades
In 1990, the film won a Saturn Award for Best Music for Alan Silvestri and a Best Supporting Actor award for Thomas F. Wilson. In 2003, it received an AOL Movies DVD Premiere Award for Best Special Edition of the Year, an award based on consumer online voting.

Notes

See also
 Steampunk
 List of 1990 box office number-one films in the United States

References

External links

 
 
 
 
 
 

Back to the Future (franchise) films
1990 films
1990 comedy films
1990s science fiction comedy films
1990s Western (genre) comedy films
1990s Western (genre) science fiction films
Amblin Entertainment films
American Western (genre) science fiction films
American science fiction adventure films
American science fiction comedy films
American sequel films
American teen comedy films
1990s English-language films
Films about time travel
Films directed by Robert Zemeckis
Films scored by Alan Silvestri
Films set in 1885
Films set in 1955
Films set in 1985
Films set in California
Films set on trains
Films shot in Arizona
Films shot in Los Angeles
Films shot in Utah
Films with screenplays by Bob Gale
Films with screenplays by Robert Zemeckis
Universal Pictures films
1990s American films
Films shot in Monument Valley